Backstage is a 2000 American documentary film directed by Chris Fiore, chronicling the 1999 Hard Knock Life Tour that featured several of hip hops top acts including Jay-Z, DMX, Method Man and Redman. Produced by Damon Dash, Backstage featured live performances by several members of Def Jam's roster and gave an in-depth look at what happened backstage.

Cast

Main cast
Jay-Z
DMX
Method Man
Redman
Beanie Sigel
Ja Rule
Memphis Bleek
DJ Clue?
Amil

Additional cast
Damon Dash
Jeremy Dash
DJ Scratch
Eve
Swizz Beatz
Pain in da Ass
Chuck D
Busta Rhymes
Sean "Puffy" Combs
Mathematics
Ed Lover
Russell Simmons
Kevin Liles
Lyor Cohen
DJ Twinz

Soundtrack

External links

2000 films
2000 documentary films
American documentary films
Concert films
Dimension Films films
Documentary films about hip hop music and musicians
2000s English-language films
2000s American films